Yi Christy Leung, also known as Liang Yi, (born December 12, 2002) is a Hong Kong figure skater. She has finished within the top twelve at three ISU Championships. She is the 2019 Chinese national champion.

Career

Early years 
Leung began learning to skate in 2009. In the 2015–2016 season, she placed fourth in the senior ranks at the 2016 Chinese Championships but was ineligible for senior and junior internationals due to her age.

2016–2017 season 
Making her junior international debut, Leung placed fifth at the Asian Open Trophy in August 2016 and tenth at an October Junior Grand Prix event in Dresden, Germany. In March, she ranked eighth in the short program, tenth in the free skate, and ninth overall at the 2017 World Junior Championships in Taipei. She became the first Hong Kong skater to finish in the top ten at an ISU Championship. Her result allowed Hong Kong to send two ladies' single skaters to the 2018 edition.

2017–2018 season 
Leung finished eleventh at the 2018 World Junior Championships in Sofia, Bulgaria.

2018–2019 season 
In her senior international debut, Leung finished fourth at the 2018 CS Asian Open Figure Skating Trophy in Bangkok, Thailand in August 2018. She finished fourth at the 2019 JGP Slovakia in Bratislava, Slovakia in August 2018, where she achieved her personal best short program score of 61.96 and personal best total score of 177.22.  She next made her Challenger seriesdebut at the 2018 CS U.S. International Figure Skating Classic, where Leung also ranked fourth. At the 2018 JGP Slovenia in October 2018, Leung ranked seventh.  She finished sixth at the 2018 CS Tallinn Trophy, her second Challenger event of the year.  In December 2018, Leung won the gold medal at the Chinese Figure Skating Championships.

Leung ranked twelfth at the 2019 Four Continents Figure Skating Championships and twenty-first in the 2019 World Junior Championships.  At the 2019 World Championships in March 2019, she ranked fourteenth in the short program with a score of 58.60 and fourteenth in the free skate with a score of 118.62, to finish fourteenth overall with a repeat of her personal best total score of 177.22.

2019–2020 season 
Leung began the season at the 2019 Shanghai Trophy, where she finished fourth.  Leung was invited to make her senior Grand Prix debut at the 2019 Skate America, replacing an injured Elizabet Tursynbaeva, and was also named as one of China's selections for the 2019 Cup of China.  She placed ninth at Skate America and eighth at the Cup of China.

After withdrawing from the Four Continents Championships, Leung was assigned to compete at the World Championships in Montreal, but these were cancelled as a result of the coronavirus pandemic.

2020–2021 season 
Leung was scheduled to compete for the only time in the pandemic-constrained season at the 2021 World Championships in Stockholm, the first of two qualifiers for the 2022 Winter Olympics in Beijing. On arrival, however, she twisted her foot in a practice session and was forced to withdraw.

Programs

Competitive highlights 
GP: Grand Prix; CS: Challenger Series; JGP: Junior Grand Prix

Detailed results

Senior

Junior

References

External links 
 

2002 births
Hong Kong female single skaters
Living people